Andrei Chesnokov was the defending champion, but did not participate this year.

Leonardo Lavalle won the tournament, beating Christo van Rensburg in the final, 6–2, 3–6, 6–3.

Seeds

Draw

Finals

Top half

Bottom half

References

 Main Draw

Tel Aviv Open
1991 ATP Tour